Neftçi-2 is an Azerbaijani football team from Baku. It plays in the Azerbaijan First Division (second level). It is a reserve team of Azerbaijan Premier League side Neftçi.

History 
The team was founded in 2018 and participates in the Azerbaijan First Division.

Honours
Azerbaijan First Division
 Winners (1): 2020–21

Current squad

Managers
 Mahmud Qurbanov (2018–present)

References

External links 
 Official Website 
 PFL

Football clubs in Baku
Association football clubs established in 2018
Neftçi PFK
Reserve team football in Azerbaijan